On 2 July 2016, a Serbian man killed five people and injured twenty-two others after he opened fire with an assault rifle in a café in the village of Žitište, in the Central Banat District of Vojvodina, Serbia. The perpetrator was later identified as Siniša Zlatić.

Shooting
On the night of 1/2 July 2016 Zlatić visited a café during a local festival, where he noticed his estranged wife with a group of friends. He returned home and retrieved an AK-47 assault rifle he illegally owned. He then returned to the café and at about 1:40am local time started shooting into the air. The attacker then shot dead his wife and another woman, before randomly shooting into the café, killing three men and injuring 22 other people. Café guests then grabbed the gun from the attacker as he tried to run away. Police located in the vicinity quickly apprehended the gunman.

Aftermath 
On 1 March 2017, High court in Zrenjanin sentenced Zlatić to 40 years in prison, the longest possible sentence according to Serbian laws.

See also

Gun politics in Serbia
Jabukovac killings
Velika Ivanča shooting

References

2016 mass shootings in Europe
2016 in Serbia
Attacks in Europe in 2016
Central Banat District
Deaths by firearm in Serbia
July 2016 crimes in Europe
Mass murder in 2016
Massacres in Serbia
Murder in Serbia
Spree shootings in Serbia
2016 murders in Europe
2016 murders in Serbia